Elena Igorevna Morozova is a Russian football midfielder, currently playing for Ryazan VDV in the Russian Championship. She previously played for Energiya Voronezh, WFC Rossiyanka, Zorky Krasnogorsk and Kubanochka Krasnodar.

Morozova started her career in 2002, at Voronezh. In 2004, she became a member of the Russian national team, and later took part in the 2009 European Championship, where she started against England and Italy. As an Under-19 international she won the 2005 U-19 Euro, as a part of the Russian national side. As of 2018, she has won 7 Russian Leagues, and 4 Russian Cups.

Morozova made her international debut with Russia against Ireland on 7 September 2005. Later on, she made her 100th and last international appearance against Wales on 6 December 2018.

Titles
 2005 Under-19 European Championship
 7 Russian Leagues (2002, 2003, 2006, 2010, 2012, 2013, 2016)
 4 Russian Cups (2006, 2008, 2009, 2010)

International career

1 The scoreline was subsequently changed for a 3–0 default win.

References

1987 births
Living people
Russian women's footballers
Russia women's international footballers
FC Energy Voronezh players
WFC Rossiyanka players
Ryazan-VDV players
FC Zorky Krasnogorsk (women) players
Women's association football midfielders
FIFA Century Club
Sportspeople from Ivanovo
Kubanochka Krasnodar players
UEFA Women's Euro 2017 players